Valen may refer to:

Places
Valen, Bindal, a fjord in the municipality of Bindal in Nordland county, Norway
Valen, Kvinnherad, a village in the municipality of Kvinnherad in Vestland county, Norway
Valen, Nærøy, a small village in the municipality of Nærøysund in Trondelag county, Norway
Valen, Vadsø, a small village in the municipality of Vadsø in Troms og Finnmark county, Norway

Other uses
Valen (surname), a surname
Valen TV, Norwegian comedy television series
Valen (Babylon 5), a character in the television series Babylon 5

See also
Vale (disambiguation)
Valan (disambiguation)
Valens (disambiguation)